Martes is a locality located in the municipality of Canal de Berdún, in Huesca province, Aragon, Spain. As of 2020, it has a population of 25.

Geography 
Martes is located 86km northwest of Huesca.

References

Populated places in the Province of Huesca